Matanuska is an impact crater on the minor planet 253 Mathilde. It is named after a coal field in the Matanuska-Susitna Valley of Alaska; the name was approved by the International Astronomical Union in 2000.

References

253 Mathilde
Impact craters on asteroids